was a Japanese swimmer and Olympic champion. He competed at the 1956 Olympic Games in Melbourne, where he received a gold medal in the 200 m breaststroke.

World records 
Furukawa improved the world record of 200 metres breaststroke (long course) four times in 1954 and 1955, and his last record lasted until 1958.

Awards 
Furukawa was inducted into the International Swimming Hall of Fame in 1981.

See also 
 List of members of the International Swimming Hall of Fame
 World record progression 200 metres breaststroke

References

External links 
 

1936 births
1993 deaths
Olympic swimmers of Japan
Swimmers at the 1956 Summer Olympics
Olympic gold medalists for Japan
World record setters in swimming
Asian Games medalists in swimming
Swimmers at the 1954 Asian Games
Swimmers at the 1958 Asian Games
Medalists at the 1956 Summer Olympics
Japanese male breaststroke swimmers
Olympic gold medalists in swimming
Asian Games gold medalists for Japan
Asian Games silver medalists for Japan
Medalists at the 1954 Asian Games
Medalists at the 1958 Asian Games
People from Hashimoto, Wakayama
Sportspeople from Wakayama Prefecture
20th-century Japanese people